Justin Warren Dunn (born September 22, 1995) is an American professional baseball pitcher for the Cincinnati Reds of Major League Baseball (MLB).  He has previously played in MLB for the Seattle Mariners. Dunn played college baseball at Boston College and was selected by the New York Mets with the 19th overall pick in the first round of the 2016 MLB draft.

Amateur career
Dunn was born in Freeport, New York to Ed, a grant administrator, and Donna, a health company recruiter. As an eighth grader, he was noticed playing at a showcase with the Boys Club of New York by the baseball coach of The Gunnery, a boarding school in Washington, Connecticut. At 13 years old, Dunn left his family on Long Island to attend The Gunnery.

The Los Angeles Dodgers selected Dunn in the 37th round of the 2013 Major League Baseball draft. He did not sign and attended Boston College to play college baseball for the Boston College Eagles. As an 18-year-old freshman in 2014, Dunn pitched  innings. He went 1–1 with a 7.30 earned run average (ERA) and 12 strikeouts. As a sophomore, he appeared in 20 games with three starts. A month into the season he became the team's closer. He finished the year 4–4 with a 4.94 ERA, 46 strikeouts and five saves. After the 2015 season, he played collegiate summer baseball with the Cotuit Kettleers of the Cape Cod Baseball League. Dunn started his junior year as the closer, but was moved into the starting rotation during the season. He recorded a 2.06 ERA with a 4–2 record in his junior season.

Career

New York Mets
Dunn was drafted by the New York Mets in the first round of the 2016 MLB draft. He signed with the Mets and was assigned to the Brooklyn Cyclones, where he spent all of 2016, posting a 1–1 record with a 1.50 ERA in 11 games (eight starts). He spent 2017 with the St. Lucie Mets where he went 5–6 with a 5.00 ERA in 20 games (16 starts).

MLB.com ranked Dunn as New York's third best prospect going into the 2018 season. He began the season with St. Lucie and was promoted to the Binghamton Rumble Ponies during the year. In 24 starts between the two clubs, Dunn was 8–8 with a 3.59 ERA.

Seattle Mariners
On December 3, 2018, the Mets traded Dunn, Jay Bruce, Jarred Kelenic, Anthony Swarzak, and Gerson Bautista to the Seattle Mariners for Edwin Díaz, Robinson Canó, and $20 million. He spent 2019 with the Arkansas Travelers, going 9–5 with a 3.55 ERA over 25 starts. He was named to the 2019 All-Star Futures Game.

The Mariners selected Dunn's contract and promoted him to the major leagues on September 10, 2019.

In 2020, he led the AL in stolen bases allowed, with 13.

On August 19, 2021, Dunn was placed on the 60-day injured list with a shoulder strain, an injury that had kept him out since mid-June. Dunn was shut down for the season in mid-September due to the injury.

Cincinnati Reds
On March 14, 2022, the Mariners traded Dunn, Jake Fraley, Brandon Williamson, and a player to be named later (Connor Phillips) to the Cincinnati Reds in exchange for Eugenio Suárez and Jesse Winker. Dunn began his Reds tenure on the 60-day injured list, with a report noting that the same shoulder strain from 2021 would keep him shelved for months.

On March 4, 2023, it was announced that Dunn would be shut down for “a couple of months” so he could recover from inflammation in the right subscapularis muscle of his rotator cuff.

References

External links

Boston College Eagles bio

1995 births
Living people
African-American baseball players
People from Freeport, New York
The Frederick Gunn School alumni
Baseball players from New York (state)
Major League Baseball pitchers
Seattle Mariners players
Cincinnati Reds players
Boston College Eagles baseball players
Cotuit Kettleers players
Brooklyn Cyclones players
St. Lucie Mets players
Binghamton Rumble Ponies players
Arkansas Travelers players
21st-century African-American sportspeople
Louisville Bats players
Dayton Dragons players